Amazing Detective Di Renjie 3, also known as Shen Tan Di Renjie 3, is the third installment in a four-season Chinese television series based on gong'an detective stories related to Di Renjie, a Tang dynasty magistrate and statesman. Written by Qian Yanqiu and directed by Qian and Zhang Wenling, the series starred Liang Guanhua as the titular protagonist, and was first broadcast on CCTV-8 on 15 March 2008, two years after the second season. It was followed by Mad Detective Di Renjie in 2010.

Plot
The plot is divided into two parts as follows:
 Hei Yi She (黑衣社), covering episodes 1 to 18.
 Cao Qu Mei Ying (漕渠魅影), covering episodes 19 to 48.

Cast
 Liang Guanhua as Di Renjie
 Zhang Zijian as Li Yuanfang
 Lü Zhong as Wu Zetian
 Xu Qian as Zeng Tai
 Dong Xuan as Yungu / Xiaoqing
 Yuan Ran as Xiaotao
 Guan Yue as Wei'er
 Song Chuyan as Wang Qiang
 Yang Zengyuan as Fang Zhe
 Zhao Chao as Liao Wenqing
 Fu Jun as Wang Kai
 Shi Baoshan as Official Li
 Su Zixi as Xiaojuan
 Liu Suhui as Laobao
 Zhao Liang as Fengyang
 Xu Ying as Jiawa
 Wu Siman as Zhala
 Gong Haibin as Qi Hu
 Wang Lei as Pan Yue
 Li Zhuolin as Shen Tao
 He Zhengheng as Xiao Bao
 Liu Jia as Yan'er
 Liu Xuejiao as Meixiang
 Zhang Shuping as Lu Jiying
 Zhao Junkai as He Wuqi
 Guo Qiming as Wen Qing
 Qu Hongni as Ning Wushuang
 Han Zhenhua as Ge Tianba
 Wang Xinsheng as Cui Liang

External links
  Amazing Detective Di Renjie (Season 3) on Sina.com

2008 Chinese television series debuts
Television series set in the Zhou dynasty (690–705)
Gong'an television series
Judge Dee
Mandarin-language television shows
China Central Television original programming
Television series set in the 7th century
Cultural depictions of Wu Zetian
Cultural depictions of Di Renjie